Honey G may refer to:

 Honey G (rapper), English rapper and The X Factor contestant
 Honey G (band), South Korean boy band